Thedinghausen is a municipality in the district of Verden, in Lower Saxony, Germany. It is situated on the left bank of the Weser, approx. 15 km west of Verden, and 20 km southeast of Bremen.

Thedinghausen is also the seat of the Samtgemeinde ("collective municipality") Thedinghausen.

References

 
Verden (district)
Duchy of Brunswick